The Tammy Grimes Show is an American sitcom starring Broadway actress Tammy Grimes that aired during the 1966–67 season on the ABC network. The Tammy Grimes Show was one of the few prime time series of the era canceled after only four episodes.

Overview
Grimes played Tammy Ward, a spendthrift heiress under the financial thumb of her Uncle Simon (Hiram Sherman). The series also stars Dick Sargent (billed as Richard) as Tammy's uptight twin brother Terrance with whom she works at their Uncle Simon's bank. Maudie Prickett appeared as Tammy's nosy housekeeper.

Reception
Upon its September 8, 1966 premiere, the series received generally negative reviews and failed to find an audience. In an unusual move for a major television network at the time, ABC opted to cancel the series after just four episodes. The Tammy Grimes Show is one of the few prime time series of the era that was canceled after one month as major networks, at the time, generally allowed a series to run a full thirteen weeks. Starting from October 6, the show was replaced by The Dating Game.

In a 1967 interview, executive producer William Dozier called the series an "organized disaster". He added, "It was the wrong idea for the wrong person at the wrong time. Movies were not for Mary Martin; television was not for Tammy Grimes."

Production notes
The Tammy Grimes Show was created by George Axelrod and executive produced by William Dozier. The series was produced by Richard Whorf and Alex Gottlieb and filmed at 20th Century Fox Studios in Century City, Los Angeles.

The theme was written by composer John Williams (credited as "Johnny Williams"), with Lionel Newman. Williams also wrote the incidental music, except for the first episode which was scored by Warren Barker.

Cast
Tammy Grimes as Tamantha "Tammy" Ward
Hiram Sherman as Uncle Simon
Dick Sargent as Terrence Ward

Episode list
ABC aired four episodes of the series. The original pilot episode, written by Axelrod (in which Tammy posed as a "Texas millionaire" in order to apply for the bank's credit card, sparking a spending spree), was never shown; scenes from it were presented during ABC's "fall preview" presentation at their annual affiliate meeting in the summer of 1966. A fifth episode entitled "The Great Charge Account War" was scheduled to air on October 6, 1966 but ABC pulled the episode from its lineup after it canceled the series in late September 1966. Scripts for eleven additional episodes were written but were never produced.

References

External links
 
 The Tammy Grimes Show at Television Obscurities

1966 American television series debuts
1966 American television series endings
1960s American sitcoms
American Broadcasting Company original programming
English-language television shows
Television series by 20th Century Fox Television